John Abraham Tinne (1877–1933) was a British politician. He was elected as a Conservative Member of Parliament at the 1924 general election, representing Liverpool Wavertree. He resigned in 1931 through appointment as Steward of the Chiltern Hundreds.

Tinne was a partner in the long-established firm of Sandbach, Tinne & Company that had been founded by one of his ancestors.

References

External links 
 

1877 births
1933 deaths
Conservative Party (UK) MPs for English constituencies
UK MPs 1924–1929
UK MPs 1929–1931